John Dowland (1563–1626) was an English Renaissance composer, lutenist, and singer. 

Dowland may refer to:

Dowland (crater), a crater on Mercury, named after John Dowland
Dowland, Devon, civil parish in England
The Dowland Manuscript, an early masonic manuscript, published by James Dowland
Jack Dowland, pen name for Philip K. Dick
John Dowland (RAF officer) (1914–1942), English aviator
Robert Dowland (1591–1641), English lutenist and composer, son of John Dowland